Claire Dederer (born 1967) is an American writer who regularly contributes essays, reviews and criticism to publications including The New York Times. She has also authored two books, Love and Trouble and Poser: My Life in Twenty-Three Yoga Poses. Poser was a New York Times best seller.

Life and career
Dederer was raised in Seattle, where she was born in 1967. She was a film critic at the Seattle Weekly before turning to freelance journalism. She has taught writing at her alma mater ('93), the University of Washington. She has two adult children with her ex-husband. She lives on boat in Seattle.

Dederer has written book reviews and articles for The New York Times and other publications. Her memoir, Love and Trouble - a midlife reckoning, was published in 2017.

Her brother, Dave Dederer, is a guitarist and singer, best known for the band The Presidents of the United States of America.

Bibliography

Books

Essays 

  (Winner of Longform essay of the year)

Book reviews

References

External links
The Official Website of Claire Dederer

1967 births
20th-century American non-fiction writers
20th-century American women writers
21st-century American non-fiction writers
21st-century American women writers
21st-century American essayists
American film critics
American women film critics
American women essayists
American women memoirists
Living people
The Atlantic (magazine) people
Writers from Seattle
University of Washington alumni
University of Washington faculty